Przyłap  is a settlement in the administrative district of Gmina Sztutowo, within Nowy Dwór Gdański County, Pomeranian Voivodeship, in northern Poland.

References

Villages in Nowy Dwór Gdański County